Mikhail Beneaminovich Iampolski is a full professor of comparative literature and Russian and Slavic studies at New York University. He is the author of The Memory of Tiresias.

Life and work
Iampolski gained a BA in 1971 at the Moscow Pedagogical Institute and a PhD in French Philosophy in 1977 at the Russian Academy of Pedagogical Sciences.

He has taught at Harvard University, University of Lausanne, and at the Moscow State Institute of Cinema Arts.

He has held the position of Getty Scholar at the J. Paul Getty Center for the History of Arts and the Humanities.

Awards
Andrej Bely Award for the best book in Humanities.

Publications
The Memory of Tiresias: Intertextuality and Film.
1993. Russian language edition.
Oakland, CA: University of California Press, 1998. . English language edition. Translated by Harsha Ram.

Contributions to publications
Socialist realism without shores. Durham, NC: Duke University Press, 1997. . Edited by Thomas Lahusen and Evgeny Dobrenko. Iampolski contributes a chapter, "Censorship as the triumph of life".
Russia on reels: the Russian idea in post-Soviet cinema. London; New York: I.B. Tauris, 1999. . Edited by Birgit Beumers. Iampolski contributes a chapter, "Representation--mimicry--death: the latest films of Alexander Sokurov".
The body of the line: Eisenstein's drawings. New York: The Drawing Center, 2000. Catalog of an exhibition held at The Drawing Center, New York, N.Y. from January 22-March 18, 2000. Iampolski contributes "Sphere, spiral, circle".
Re: the Rainbow. Frankfurt am Main Revolver, Archiv für Aktuelle Kunst Lund Propexus, 2004. . Edited by Aris Fioretos.
The cinema of Alexander Sokurov.  London; New York: I.B. Tauris, 2011. Edited by Birgit Beumers and Nancy Condee. Iampolski contributes a chapter, "Truncated families and absolute intimacy".
Pastoral / Moscow Suburbs. Rome: Contrasto, 2013. . Photographs by Alexander Gronsky. Iampolski contributes a short essay, "Alexander Gronsky: Givenness without the Given".

References

External links
New York University bio

Historians of Russia
Living people
Year of birth missing (living people)
New York University faculty